The George F. Barton House was designed by Frank Lloyd Wright, built 1903–1904, and is located at 118 Summit Avenue in Buffalo, New York. The Barton House is part of the larger Darwin D. Martin House Complex, considered to be one of the most important projects from Wright's Prairie School era.

History
The complex was commissioned by Darwin D. Martin, an entrepreneur who worked at the Larkin Soap Company. The site was purchased by Martin in 1902 as a location where he planned to build two houses: one for himself, and one for his sister, Delta Martin Barton, and her husband, George F. Barton.

Martin and Barton were colleagues at the Larkin Company, and Wright also designed houses for other Larkin employees William R. Heath and Walter V. Davidson, as well as the Larkin Company's administration building.

Of the Martin Complex's six buildings construction on the Barton House began first and not only was it the first building of the complex to be completed but also the first of Wright's in Buffalo.

The Barton House is on the north east corner of the complex.

The basic floor plan is cruciform, with the principal living spaces concentrated in the center two-story portion of the house where the reception, living and dining areas open into each other. The two main bedrooms are on the second story, at either end of a narrow hall. The kitchen is at the north end, behind the main stairway, while an open porch is to the south.

Wright's K. C. DeRhodes House in South Bend, Indiana, has a nearly identical floor plan to the Barton House—although on a 90-degree axis in relation to the front veranda. The F.B. Henderson House in Elmhurst, Illinois is also similar in plan.

The Martin House Restoration Corporation operates guided public tours and presents educational programs for both volunteers and the general public.

See also
Darwin D. Martin House Complex

References

William Allin Storrer, The Frank Lloyd Wright Companion. University of Chicago Press, 2006, (S.303)

External links

Graycliff Official Site, member of the Great Lakes Seaway Trail

Houses completed in 1904
Martin House
Historic house museums in New York (state)
Houses on the National Register of Historic Places in New York (state)
National Historic Landmarks in New York (state)
Historic American Buildings Survey in New York (state)
New York (state) historic sites
Museums in Buffalo, New York
Houses in Buffalo, New York
Buildings and structures in Buffalo, New York
National Register of Historic Places in Buffalo, New York